The 1912 United States presidential election in New Jersey took place on November 5, 1912. All contemporary 48 states were part of the 1912 United States presidential election. Voters chose 14 electors to the Electoral College, which selected the president and vice president.

New Jersey was won by the Democratic nominees, Governor Woodrow Wilson of New Jersey and his running mate Governor Thomas R. Marshall of Indiana. Wilson and Marshall defeated the Progressive Party nominees, former President Theodore Roosevelt of New York and his running mate Governor Hiram Johnson of California, and the Republican nominees, incumbent President William Howard Taft of Ohio and his running mate incumbent Vice President James S. Sherman of New York. 

Wilson carried New Jersey with a bare plurality of 41.20 percent of the vote to Roosevelt's 33.60 percent, a victory margin of 7.60 percent. Taft came in third place with 20.53 percent. Coming in a distant fourth was Socialist candidate Eugene V. Debs, who took 3.69 percent.

Like much of the Northeast, New Jersey in this era was a staunchly Republican state, having not given a majority of the vote to a Democratic presidential candidate since 1892. In his initial 1908 election campaign, Taft had carried New Jersey by a comfortable 57–39 margin. However, in 1912, the Republican Party was split as former Republican President Theodore Roosevelt ran as a third party candidate against incumbent Republican President William Howard Taft, splitting the Republican voter base, and allowing Wilson to win many states with pluralities. Despite being the sitting Governor of New Jersey, Wilson only managed to earn 41 percent of the vote in his home state, but with the GOP split, this would prove to be enough to win New Jersey's electoral votes. Were Taft and Roosevelt voters united behind a single Republican candidate, the GOP would have received 54.13 percent of the vote. (Four years later, in 1916, Wilson would lose his home state to the GOP in the midst of his otherwise successful re-election bid by a decisive 12-point margin in a head-to-head match-up, with Republican Charles Evans Hughes taking 54.40 percent to Wilson's 42.68 percent.)

On the county-level map, Wilson carried 17 of the state's 21 counties, although seven with pluralities between forty and fifty of the vote, and six with pluralities of less than forty percent. Wilson won majorities only in urban Hudson County and the three rural counties in western North Jersey, Warren, Sussex, and Hunterdon, which had long been non-Yankee Democratic enclaves in the otherwise Republican Northeast. Warren and Hunterdon had never voted Republican as of 1912, and Sussex only for William McKinley in 1896.

As Roosevelt and his Bull Moose Party finished a strong second ahead of incumbent Republican Taft in the state, the remaining four counties went to Roosevelt. Roosevelt won urban Essex County along with Ocean County with pluralities between 40 and 50% of the vote, while winning Passaic County and Cumberland County with pluralities of less than 40% of the vote. Taft finished a weak third place in the state for an incumbent president and official Republican nominee, and failed to win a single county in New Jersey.

Although it was Wilson's home state and he had served as governor there, the results in 1912 made the state about 6% more Progressive than the nation. Wilson became the only candidate in the 1912 election to carry both his home state (New Jersey) and his birth state Virginia. This was the first time since its first election in 1852 that Ocean County did not vote for a Republican.

Results

Results by county

See also
 Presidency of Woodrow Wilson
 United States presidential elections in New Jersey

Notes

References

New Jersey
1912
1912 New Jersey elections